is a Japanese television drama based on the South Korean movie My Sassy Girl. It narrates the story between Saburo Masaki, a marine biologist, and Riko Takami, an aspiring writer with a short temper.  While the two are at odds with each other at first, they eventually become attracted to each other and develop a relationship. It received an average of 8.18% viewer rating throughout the series.

Cast
 Tsuyoshi Kusanagi as Saburo Masaki
 Rena Tanaka as Riko Takami
 Nao Matsushita as Minami Asakura
 Emi Suzuki as Haruka Kisaragi
 Shintaro Yamada as Moichi Goto
 Mitsuki Oishi as Wakaba Hayashida
 Yuko Chino (千野裕子) as Asami Yue
 Rie Kokubo (小久保利恵) as Yui Shimaki
 Koichi Kosse (コッセこういち) as Masashi Sone
 Yoshie Ichige as Satsuki Hayashida
 Nahomi Matsushima as Yuzuko Yutenji
 Shosuke Tanihara as Kensaku Kazushima
 Takaya Kamikawa as Keisuke Natsume
 Somegoro Ichikawa as Shunsuke Nonomura

External links
 Official website 

2008 in Japanese television
2008 Japanese television series debuts
2008 Japanese television series endings
Japanese drama television series
Nichiyō Gekijō
Television shows written by Yûji Sakamoto
Live action television shows based on films